"Giddy Giddap! Go On! Go On! We're On Our Way to War" is a World War I song written and composed by Jack Frost. This song was published in 1917 by Frank K. Root & Co., in Chicago, Illinois.
The sheet music cover depicts a mule pulling four soldiers in a wagon.

This song is featured in the 1918 publication of The Army Song Book. The sheet music can be found at the Pritzker Military Museum & Library.  The song is in the public domain.

References

Bibliography
Paas, John Roger. 2014. America sings of war: American sheet music from World War I. . 
Parker, Bernard S. World War I Sheet Music 1. Jefferson: McFarland & Company, Inc., 2007. . 
Vogel, Frederick G. World War I Songs: A History and Dictionary of Popular American Patriotic Tunes, with Over 300 Complete Lyrics. Jefferson: McFarland & Company, Inc., 1995. . 

1917 songs
Songs of World War I